Aeroflot Flight 244 was hijacked on 15 October 1970, making it the first known successful airline hijacking in the Soviet Union.

Synopsis 
Lithuanian Pranas Brazinskas and his 13-year-old son Algirdas seized an An-24 domestic passenger plane en route from Batumi, Adjar ASSR, Georgian SSR, to Sukhumi and Krasnodar to defect to the West. Pranas had been sentenced twice by the Soviet authorities in 1955 and 1965 for financial crimes related to state-run shops where he worked. They selected seats closest to the cockpit in the cabin. Five minutes after takeoff while the aircraft was at an altitude of 800 meters, they called over the flight attendant Nadezhda Kurchenko and demanded control of the aircraft in a threatening note. Kurchenko tried to block the entrance to the cockpit but failed, yelling out that the two were armed shortly before the hijackers shot her twice at point blank range, killing her.

Several members of the crew were wounded in the onboard shootout. Pranas Brazinskas claimed the shootout occurred because of resistance from two armed guards on board. According to Russian media, the shootout was started by Brazinskas when the flight attendant ran to the cockpit to warn the pilots, and there were no guards on board.  The hijackers commandeered the plane to Trabzon, Turkey, and surrendered to the Turkish government.

Aftermath 
The Brazinskas were tried and imprisoned, but Turkey refused to extradite them to the Soviet authorities. The plane with its passengers was soon returned to the USSR. After spending some time in prison, the Brazinskas were granted amnesty in 1974 and made their way to Venezuela and finally to the United States. They were initially arrested but later allowed to apply for asylum.

The Soviet Union condemned the United States for granting asylum to murderers and pressed for their extradition. Up until the dissolution of the Soviet Union in 1991, the Soviet government continued to press for the extradition of the Brazinskas, and regularly assailed what they alleged was American hypocrisy in harboring terrorists who attack the aircraft of socialist countries, while pursuing very different actions against terrorists who attacked American nationals, such as in the Achille Lauro case.

In 2002, Algirdas (now known as Albert Victor White) was convicted in Santa Monica of murdering his 77-year-old father Pranas (by then known as Frank White) during a family argument.

After the hijacking, flight number 244 was still in use, even after the Dissolution of the Soviet Union in 1991. The current flight departs from Moscow to Mahé, Seychelles.

See also 
Aeroflot Flight 6833
List of Soviet and Eastern Bloc defectors

References 

1970 in international relations
1970 in the Soviet Union
1970 in Turkey
1970 murders in Turkey
244
Aircraft hijackings in Asia
Aircraft hijackings in Europe
Aviation accidents and incidents in 1970
Aviation accidents and incidents in Georgia (country)
Aviation accidents and incidents in the Soviet Union
Accidents and incidents involving the Antonov An-24
Batumi
Eastern Bloc defectors
History of Adjara
Murder in the Soviet Union
October 1970 crimes
October 1970 events in Asia
October 1970 events in Europe
Soviet Union–United States relations
1970 murders in the Soviet Union